Cornish House may refer to:

Cornish House (Little Rock, Arkansas), listed on the NRHP in Arkansas
Cornish House (Bowdoinham, Maine), listed on the NRHP in Maine
Joel N. Cornish House, Omaha, NE, listed on the NRHP in Nebraska